Renaida Kebyera Braun (born 14 August 1997), sometimes known simply as Renaida, is a Swedish singer. She first began her singing career participating in Idol 2016 which was broadcast on TV4, where she placed sixth. Afterwards, she began performing in the musical Aladdin. Braun competed in Melodifestivalen 2018 with the song "All the Feels", and qualified to Andra Chansen from the first semi-final. She was drawn in a duel with singer Olivia Eliasson for a place in the final, and won, therefore qualifying to the Grand Final, where she finished in ninth place.

In October 2019, Braun revealed that she had been diagnosed with cancer. The following month she stated that her cancer was successfully removed from her neck, and she will not need to undergo any further treatments.

Singles

References

External links

1997 births
Idol (Swedish TV series) participants
Living people
People from Nyköping Municipality
Swedish adoptees
Tanzanian emigrants to Sweden
Swedish pop singers
21st-century Swedish singers
21st-century Swedish women singers
Melodifestivalen contestants of 2018